The Upper Canal System, also called the Southern Railway Aqueduct and the Cataract Tunnel, is a heritage-listed operational gravity-fed aqueduct that supplies some of the potable water for Sydney, in New South Wales, Australia. The aqueduct comprises  of open canals, tunnels, and closed pipelines that connect the Upper Nepean Scheme with the Prospect Reservoir. The aqueduct is managed by the Sydney Catchment Authority on behalf of WaterNSW, an agency of the Government of New South Wales. It was listed on the New South Wales State Heritage Register on 18 November 1999.

Description
The Upper Canal forms a major component of the Upper Nepean Scheme. The Upper Canal commences by tunnel from Pheasant's Nest Weir on the Nepean River and extends through the local government areas of Wollondilly, Camden, Campbelltown, Liverpool, Fairfield, and Cumberland, to terminate at the Prospect Reservoir.

After the Nepean and Cataract tunnels, the aqueduct drops just  in elevation over its  course, or just 0.1 percent grade.

The canal system is built from a variety of materials, depending on the nature of the country it passes through. Where the ground is soft, the canal system is trapezoidal in shape and the sides lined with unreinforced concrete slabs. In other sections, the canal is u-shaped and the sides are lined with sandstone masonry. Where the canal system is cut into solid rock, it is unlined. Tunnels allow the aqueduct to pass under hills. These are unlined if cut through solid rock, or lined with brick or sandstone if cut through softer material. Above ground pipelines allow the canal system to cross creeks and gullies. These were inverted iron syphons resting on sandstone piers. Many of the original iron pipes remain in use, some lined with plastic sleeves to protect the pipes and keep them waterproof. Many of the original mechanisms to control and divert the water's flow - such as stop logs, penstocks, and gate valves - are also still in use.

In recent years, water control structures have been installed to assist with regulation of water levels in the canal and to cater for varying flow rates.

It is estimated that the Upper Nepean System and, hence, the Upper Canal System, supplies in the range of 20 to 40 per cent of Sydney's daily demand for potable water.

History
In 1867, the Governor of New South Wales appointed a Commission to recommend a scheme for Sydney's water supply, and by 1869 it was recommended that construction commence on the Upper Nepean Scheme. This consisted of two diversion weirs, located at Pheasant's Nest and Broughton's Pass, in the Upper Nepean River catchment, with water feeding into a series of tunnels, canals and aqueducts known as the Upper Canal. It was intended that water be fed by gravity from the catchment into a reservoir at Prospect. This scheme was to be Sydney's fourth water supply system, following the Tank Stream, Busby's Bore and the Botany Swamps. The Upper Canal, now managed by the Sydney Catchment Authority, is divided into eleven maintenance sections, from Pheasant's Nest to the Prospect Reservoir. Historically each of these sections had its own section keeper, with a cottage built along the section.

Heritage listing

The aqueduct was listed on the New South Wales State Heritage Register on 18 November 1999 with the following statement of significance:

See also

 List of reservoirs and dams in New South Wales
 Prospect Reservoir Valve House
 Sydney Water
 Shoalhaven Scheme
 Upper Nepean Scheme

References

Attribution 
 
 

1888 establishments in Australia
Aqueducts in Australia
Macarthur (New South Wales)
Pipelines in Australia
Transport buildings and structures in New South Wales
Sydney Water
Upper Nepean Scheme
New South Wales State Heritage Register
Sandstone buildings in Australia